Qasimabad Tehsil is an administrative subdivision (tehsil) of Hyderabad District in the Sindh province of Pakistan. H

Administration
The Taluka of Qasimabad is administratively subdivided into 27 municipal committees. The population is more than 99% the Sindhi people.

Current Administration:

Chairman:                           Kashif Hussain Shoro

Assistant Commissioner:      Gada Hussain

Mukhtiarkar:                           Altaf Korejo

References

Talukas of Sindh
Hyderabad District, Pakistan